Carol Smith may refer to:

 Carol Smith (contralto) (1926–2021), American contralto 
 Carol Comeau (born 1941), née Smith, American educator
 Carol Smith (radio presenter) (born 1975), Singaporean radio presenter
 Carol Smith (softball), head coach of the LSU Tigers softball team

See also
 Carroll Smith (1932–2003), American race car driver
 Carole Smith (born 1954), American educational administrator